Rublon is a two-factor authentication system that acts as an additional security layer which protects the password-based login process to web applications. A protected account can only be accessed by someone who enters the correct password and scans a QR code using the Rublon mobile app, which holds the digital identity of the account's owner. In web browsers that have been previously defined as trusted, only the password is needed in order to sign into a protected account of any supported web application.

Mobile app 
Accounts can be protected by installing the Rublon mobile app, which is available for smartphones with Android, BlackBerry OS, iOS and Windows Phone. The app is also used to define trusted browsers that make it possible to sign in using a password only. The app can be activated by providing an email address, which results in the creation of the user's digital identity using asymmetric cryptographic RSA keys.

Supported web applications 
Rublon protects the accounts of web applications that are integrated with its system. There are plugins for Magento, PrestaShop and WordPress, allowing administrators of websites based on these platforms to integrate them without programming. Web application developers may use the Java and PHP SDKs to integrate Rublon with their services.

References

External links
 Official Rublon website
 Rublon Developers - official developer portal

Applications of cryptography
Application programming interfaces
Cloud applications
Computer access control
Computer security software
Crime prevention
Cryptographic software
Data security
Proprietary software
Web software